List of tourist drives in Queensland includes numbered and un-numbered routes. Most routes have an official name, but some have been named in this article based on the region in which they occur. Some duplication of numbers exists where the Queensland Government and a local authority have each chosen the same number for use in different regions. General information about tourist drives in Queensland can be found here: .

Unless stated otherwise, all distance and road name information in this article is derived from Google Maps.

Strategic touring routes

State Strategic Touring Routes are road routes in Queensland, Australia, which have been identified as significant to motoring tourists. These are the primary routes used by tourists as they provide the connections between popular tourist locations, and consequently have high volumes of tourist traffic. Standardised road signage is used to identify the route itself, with "Welcome to" signage at towns and districts of interest to tourists, as well as "turn off" signage to natural attractions.

Un-numbered tourist drives

Numbered tourist drives

See also
 List of road routes in Queensland

References 

State Strategic Touring Routes in Queensland
Roads in Queensland